Alopecosa beckeri is a species of wolf spider found in Ukraine and south European Russia

See also 
 List of Lycosidae species

References 

beckeri
Spiders of Europe
Spiders described in 1875